Henry Grattan (1789 – 16 July 1859) was an Irish politician, who was Member of Parliament for Dublin City on behalf of the Whigs from 1826 to 1830 in the British House of Commons. From 1831 to 1852, he represented Meath for the Repeal Association.

Grattan was called to the Irish Bar in 1810.  His father, also named Henry Grattan, was a famous Irish orator and statesman.  Grattan senior was MP for Dublin City, and on his father's death in 1820, Grattan junior was the Whig candidate to succeed him.  However at a by-election on 30 June of that year, he was defeated by the Tory candidate, Thomas Ellis.  In the 1826 general election, Grattan was returned unopposed for the Dublin City seat. He was defeated in the 1830 general election, when he finished third in the election for the two-member Dublin City seat.

In 1831, Grattan was elected an MP for Meath at a by-election on 11 August 1831 after having been defeated there in the general election earlier that year. He retained his seat as a Repealer candidate in the 1832 general election and as a Liberal Repealer in 1835 and 1841. In the general election of 1847 Grattan was again elected as a Repealer candidate. However, in the 1852 general election, Grattan, standing as a Liberal, pledged to support the Irish Independent Opposition Party (which some of the Irish MPs organised in 1852), was defeated.

References
Parliamentary Election Results in Ireland, 1801-1922, edited by B.M. Walker (Royal Irish Academy 1978)
The Parliaments of England by Henry Stooks Smith (1st edition published in three volumes 1844–50), 2nd edition edited (in one volume) by F.W.S. Craig (Political Reference Publications 1973)
Who's Who of British Members of Parliament: Volume I 1832-1885, edited by M. Stenton (The Harvester Press 1976)

External links 
 

1789 births
1859 deaths
Members of the Parliament of the United Kingdom for County Dublin constituencies (1801–1922)
Members of the Parliament of the United Kingdom for County Meath constituencies (1801–1922)
Irish barristers
Irish Repeal Association MPs
Whig (British political party) MPs for Irish constituencies
UK MPs 1826–1830
UK MPs 1831–1832
UK MPs 1832–1835
UK MPs 1835–1837
UK MPs 1837–1841
UK MPs 1841–1847
UK MPs 1847–1852